The 1952 Summer Olympics torch relay was the symbolic transport of the Olympic flame from Olympia, Greece, to the venue of the 1952 Summer Olympics in Helsinki, Finland, where it featured as part of the opening ceremony.

Relay elements

Flame

The 1952 Olympic flame was lit at a ceremony using the sun's rays in Olympia, from where it started its journey on 25 June.

On 6 July, a second flame was lit on top of the Taivaskero peak of Pallastunturi fell in the Finnish Lapland. The intention had been to ignite it with the rays of the midnight sun, but due to overcast conditions that night some additional 'tricks' were required.

The two flames were merged for the remainder of their journey.

Torch

The torches were made of either solid silver or silver-plated brass, with a lacquered curly birch handle.

The fuel was liquid gas contained in a cartridge which was quick and easy to replace. For this reason, only 22 torches were needed, as well as 1,600 fuel cartridges.

Because of the small number produced, the 1952 torch is a rarity not found in many collections, and therefore highly collectable: at a 2011 auction in Paris, one was sold for the record price of €290,000 or nearly US$400,000.

The torch was designed by Finnish graphic designer and visual artist  and manufactured by the precious metals company .

Route
The flame was carried from Olympia to Athens, from where it was flown to Aalborg, Denmark, via two intermediary stops in West Germany (in Munich and Düsseldorf). There were celebrations held at each stop of the journey. This was the first time the Olympic flame was flown out of Greece.

Next, the flame traversed Denmark over land and water by different modes of transport, finishing with crossing the Øresund strait from Copenhagen to Malmö, Sweden.

In Sweden the flame was carried overland via Gothenburg to Stockholm, where on 4 July it was kept burning overnight at the 1912 Olympics stadium. Afterwards it continued its journey north, eventually leaving Sweden by crossing the northern land border to Finland, where it was united with the 'Midnight Torch' flame on 8 July.

Over the next ten days the torch was carried south by 1,350 runners, arriving in Helsinki on the opening day of the games, 19 July. On its final stage through the city of Helsinki, the relay procession was fronted by a police car in radio contact with the organisers at the stadium, with the intention of adjusting the relay pace as needed. Consequently, the torch arrived at the stadium with perfect timing.

The distances and methods of transport in each country were as follows:

The route took in the cities of, among others, Aalborg, Aarhus, Copenhagen, Malmö, Gothenburg, Stockholm, Uppsala, Tornio, Oulu, Jyväskylä, Tampere and Hämeenlinna, before reaching Helsinki.

A commemorative copper medal was given to each person carrying the torch on its journey.

Lighting of the cauldron

The flame was brought to the Helsinki Olympic Stadium by the Finnish long-distance runner Paavo Nurmi, himself a winner of multiple gold and silver medals at the 1920, 1924 and 1928 Olympics. He used the torch to light a temporary cauldron on the stadium field.

Four players from a Helsinki football club ran up the tower with the torch, passing it to another Finnish long-distance runner, Hannes Kolehmainen, also a winner of multiple medals at the 1912 and 1920 Olympics, who finally lit the main cauldron.

See also

1952 Summer Olympics
Pallastunturi
1952 Winter Olympics torch relay

References

External links
Helsinki 1952 Torch Relay on the Olympic Games official site

Olympic torch relays
1952 Summer Olympics
1952 in Finnish sport
1952 in Finland
Olympic Games in Finland